Adam Hamilton (born July 12, 1964) is an American minister. He is the senior pastor of the 25,000-member United Methodist Church of the Resurrection in Leawood, Kansas, the largest United Methodist congregation in the world, measured by both weekend attendance and membership.

Hamilton has received numerous awards, including two honorary doctorates, the B'nai B'rith award in Social Ethics, the Denman Award in Evangelism, and the Circuit Rider Award for excellence in church leadership. He was named one of the "Ten People to Watch in America's Spiritual Landscape" by Religion & Ethics Newsweekly and Distinguished Evangelist of the United Methodist Church by the Foundation for Evangelism. He is a trustee at Saint Paul School of Theology and as a member of the Kansas East Board of Professional Ministry. He lectures on leadership, evangelism, and preaching across the country. Hamilton spoke at the 2010 Willow Creek Leadership Summit on the topic of leaders and the power of temptation. Following the second inauguration of President Barack Obama, Hamilton delivered the sermon at the inaugural prayer service held at the Washington National Cathedral on January 22, 2013.

Biography

Education and calling

Hamilton was born on July 12, 1964. He grew up in the Kansas City area, being born to teenage parents who divorced when he was 12, and graduated from Blue Valley High School. He completed his Bachelor of Arts degree at Oral Roberts University and graduate school at Perkins School of Theology at Southern Methodist University.

At the age of 14, Hamilton was at the house of a friend when a Pentecostal layman and door-to-door evangelist knocked on the front door. The visitor evangelized, despite being able to speak only through an artificial voice box held up to his throat. The man invited the boys to church, and even though they joked with one another that he sounded like Darth Vader, Hamilton went. Hamilton has stated that he did not know why he attended the church services but hinted at the answer by admitting, "I wasn't interested in God. I was interested in girls". Original motives notwithstanding, Hamilton continued participating in the church and increasingly felt drawn to God. Finally, after reading the Gospel of Luke, Hamilton decided to become a Christian. His original goal did not go unmet, however. While attending services at the Pentecostal church, he met the girl who would later become his wife, LaVon Bandy. Together, they have two adult daughters.

Still affiliated with the Pentecostal church after graduating, Hamilton attended Oral Roberts University in Tulsa, Oklahoma, earning a Bachelor of Arts degree in pastoral ministry (1985). During his time at Oral Roberts University, Hamilton began questioning the theology he had received during his teenage years. During this period of searching, he came across a copy of the United Methodist Book of Discipline and decided the United Methodist Church seemed to be a better fit for him theologically. After completing his undergraduate education, he enrolled in Perkins School of Theology, a United Methodist seminary.

Church of the Resurrection

In 1990, following a stint as an associate pastor in a United Methodist congregation, Hamilton was appointed to plant a new church in south Johnson County, Kansas, after requesting permission from the local bishop to do so. The bishop told Hamilton that, given 10 years, the church might even grow to 500 members. At the time, all of the schools and community buildings in the area were being leased on Sunday mornings by other church plants who had similar aspirations.  Hamilton decided to ask the owner of the newly built McGilley State Line Chapel funeral home if the new church could meet there for Sunday morning worship services. Before Hamilton got the chance to ask, however, the owner contacted Hamilton and asked him if the new church would consider meeting there. Hamilton casually agreed. The name Church of the Resurrection seemed to be a good fit for a congregation that met in a funeral home.

In the early 1990s, most church plants in the area were following the new trend of contemporary worship pioneered by Willow Creek Community Church in South Barrington, Illinois. Hamilton realized that many baby boomers in his community had grown up in United Methodist congregations but had left the church in early adulthood. He thought that many of these nominally Christian boomers would return to a church that resembled the church of their childhood but was more relevant to their daily lives.

Hamilton also surmised that the educated population of Leawood would be drawn by sermons that engaged not only the heart but also the head. Therefore, Hamilton's sermons are addressed to thoughtful Christians who have questioned their faith and are comfortable with nuance. His aim in preaching is to impart content to the congregation that would be the equivalent of a college course on the topic.

Mainline renewal

Hamilton is committed to the renewal of the mainline church, especially the United Methodist Church. According to the church website, Church of the Resurrection was listed as the most influential mainline church in America in a 2005 survey of American pastors. The Church of the Resurrection has a threefold focus:  1. Reaching non-religious and nominally religious people and helping them become committed followers of Jesus Christ;  2. Equipping and inspiring members to live their faith in mission to the community and world; and 3. Acting as a catalyst for renewing the mainline church. This mission is spelled out with large signage on the walls of the church narthex. Annually, the church hosts Leadership Institute, a conference aimed at mostly mainline church leaders, at which they can learn about the latest outreach methods employed by Church of the Resurrection.

In addition, recruiting, training, and supporting young United Methodist clergy is a major piece of Hamilton's renewal strategy. He founded the Young Pastors Network with his close friend Michael Slaughter of Ginghamsburg Church to help support and train young pastors. In an April 2009 post on the United Methodist Young Clergy website, Hamilton is quoted as stating:

I have a heart for wanting to see the United Methodist Church renewed. God isn't finished with it yet. We have an approach for the gospel that is exactly what's needed for the 21st century. Our theology was postmodern and emergent before it was cool.

Young Pastor: The young clergy need the wisdom of those who have come before them and the older clergy need the insight, vision and energy of a group of people who might better understand the needs of this generation. So, in short – I would like to see more REAL partnerships taking place between younger clergy and more experienced clergy – to really begin dreaming and thinking about how the church needs to change in the future.... and then the money to back up their visions!

Bibliography and sermons
 24 Hours That Changed the World
 Christianity and World Religions: Wrestling with Questions People Ask
 Christianity's Family Tree: What Other Christians Believe and Why
 Confronting the Controversies: A Christian Responds to the Tough Issues
 Enough: Discovering Joy through Simplicity and Generosity
 Final Words From the Cross
 Forgiveness: Finding Peace Through Letting Go
 2016. Half Truths: God Helps Those Who Help Themselves and Other Things the Bible Doesn't Say
 John: The Gospel of Light and Life
 Leading Beyond the Walls: Developing Congregations with a Heart for the Unchurched
 Love to Stay: Sex, Grace, and Commitment
 Making Sense of the Bible: Rediscovering the Power of Scripture Today
 Not a Silent Night: Mary Looks Back to Bethlehem
 Revival: Faith as Wesley Lived It
 Seeing Gray in a World of Black and White: Thoughts on Religion, Morality, and Politics
 Selling Swimsuits in the Arctic: Seven Simple Keys to Growing Churches
 Speaking Well: Essential Skills for Speakers, Leaders, and Preachers
 The Call: The Life and Message of the Apostle Paul
 The Journey: Walking the Road to Bethlehem
 The Way: Walking in the Footsteps of Jesus
 Unafraid: Living with Courage and Hope in Uncertain Times
 Unleashing the Word: Preaching with Relevance, Purpose, and Passion
 When Christians Get It Wrong
 Why? Making Sense of God's Will

Many of Hamilton's books deal with life problems and lessons in a way that is accessible to Christians and non-Christians alike.

References

External links
 
 
 Sermons at Church of the Resurrection

1964 births
Living people
Methodist writers
Oral Roberts University alumni
Perkins School of Theology alumni
American United Methodist clergy
People from South Barrington, Illinois